Dangez (also Romanized as Dangz; also known as Dang) is a village in Dehkuyeh Rural District, in the Central District of Larestan County, Fars Province, Iran. At the 2006 census, its population was 474, in 117 families.

References 

Populated places in Larestan County